Abdul Qasim Mohammad Badruddoza Chowdhury (known as AQM Badrudozza Chowdhury;  ; born 1 November 1932) served as the President of Bangladesh from 14 November 2001 until his resignation on 21 June 2002. He was the founding secretary-general of Bangladesh Nationalist Party (BNP).

He is also a physician, and former cultural activist, an author, essayist, playwright, television presenter and an orator of distinction. He was awarded the National Television Award in 1976.

Early life
Chowdhury was born in his maternal grandfather's house in Comilla. His grandfather's home is in Majidpur Dayhata, Srinagar, Bikrampur (now Munshiganj District). His father's name is Kafiluddin chowdhury former provincial minister of East Pakistan and awami league leader .He passed his SSC from St Gregory's School in 1947 and HSC from Dhaka College in 1949. He earned his MBBS degree from Dhaka Medical College in 1954–1955.
His father Kafiluddin Chowdhury was a political leader of Awami League, a former general secretary of the United Front serving as Minister in the United Front provincial cabinet of the then East Pakistan. His mother is Sufia Khatun.

Medical career
Chowdhury started his career in the medical profession. He served as an associate professor of medicine in Rajshahi Medical College in 1964 and Sir Salimullah Medical College during 1964–1970 and professor of medicine in Sylhet Medical College in 1970. He served as the president of National Anti-Tuberculosis Association of Bangladesh (NATAB), president of International Union Against Tuberculosis of Lung Diseases (IUATLD) of Asia Pacific Zone.

Political career
Being inspired by Ziaur Rahman, the founder chairman of the party, Badruddoza entered into politics as the secretary general of the BNP during its early years. He won the parliament election of 1979 as a BNP nominee from Munshiganj and served as cabinet minister during the years 1979–1982. When the BNP again won parliamentary elections in 1991, after a short stint as Education and Cultural Affairs Minister, he was appointed Deputy Leader of the House of Bangladesh parliament.

Presidency
Chowdhury was appointed the foreign minister of Bangladesh when BNP party came to power in 2001. In November 2001, he was elected the President of Bangladesh by Jatiyo Sangshad members. Seven months later the incident of him deciding not to visit BNP founder Ziaur Rahman's grave on his death anniversary provoked the party members. They accused him of betraying the party. In June 2002, Chowdhury resigned from office as was asked by the ruling party before the situation could turn any murkier.

Bikalpa Dhara
Chowdhury felt the need of a third force in the de facto two-party democracy in Bangladesh. He expressed recruiting civil society members in politics to fight corruption and terrorism and establish good governance in the country through an alternate stream (lit. Bikalpa Dhara) political party. He, along with his son Mahi B. Chowdhury and BNP parliamentarian M A Mannan resigned from the BNP to work for the new political party. Chowdhury was the president, with M A Mannan as the secretary-general of the new party, Bikalpa Dhara Bangladesh, formed in March 2004. It had been a strong critic of the government during the time, and most of its members were defects from the ruling BNP.

For a brief period Chowdhury joined with senior statesman Oli Ahmed. Along with various senior ministers from the BNP cabinet they formed the Liberal Democratic Party (LDP) Bangladesh. This did not last and Chowdhury decided to come out of LDP and concentrate his efforts on reviving Bikalpa Dhara.

Chowdhury has been the party's president since its inception, except for a brief period between December 2008 and April 2009, during which time he had resigned from his post after the party could secure no seats during the 9th parliament elections.

Personal life
Chowdhury is married to Hasina Warda Chowdhury. Together they have a son, Mahi B. Chowdhury and two daughters Muna Chowdhury is a Barrister in Law & Shaila Sharmin Chowdhury is a doctor.

References

1932 births
Living people
People from Bikrampur
Dhaka College alumni
Dhaka Medical College alumni
General Secretaries of Bangladesh Nationalist Party
Bangladesh Nationalist Party politicians
Foreign ministers of Bangladesh
Presidents of Bangladesh
Liberal Democratic Party (Bangladesh) politicians
Recipients of the Independence Day Award
2nd Jatiya Sangsad members
Bangladeshi political party founders
Bangladeshi physicians
St. Gregory's High School and College alumni